DWAI-TV (channel 7) is a television station in Naga, Camarines Sur, Philippines, airing programming from the GMA network. It is owned and operated by the network's namesake corporate parent alongside GTV outlet DZDP-TV (channel 28). Both stations share studios and transmitters at the GMA Broadcast Complex, Concepcion Pequeña, Naga City.

About DWAI-TV 7
1986 - GMA started its broadcast in Naga, Camarines Sur via Channel 7 (after GMA 12 Legazpi started in 1982) since People Power Revolution, with the network's own variation of GMA Radio-Television Arts ident aside from sporting a light blue square logo with the network name in white, also had a circle 7 logo in use, in its final years the blue circle 7 logo used was similar to those used by the ABC in some United States cities and later used the rainbow colors of red, yellow, green and blue stripes.
April 30, 1992 - Coinciding with the network's Rainbow Satellite Network launch, GMA Channel 7 Naga started its nationwide satellite broadcast to bring live broadcasts of Manila-sourced national programming via DZBB-TV, GMA's flagship TV station in Manila, to viewers in the Bicol Region, utilizes a new logo to correspond with the rebranding and a satellite-beaming rainbow in a multicolored striped based on the traditional scheme of red, orange, yellow, green, blue, indigo and violet, with GMA in a metallic form uses a San Serif Country Gothic Extra Bold and analogous gloominess of indigo as its fonts in the letters.
May 16, 1996 - Republic Broadcasting System formally changed its corporate name to GMA Network Incorporated, with GMA now standing for Global Media Arts.
2009 - GMA Network launched GMA TV-7 Naga as its satellite station in the Bicol Region.
November 22, 2010 - GMA Naga launched its first locally produced programs Bicolandia Isyu Ngonian and Flash Bulletin.
August 10, 2012 - GMA Naga was upgraded to a "super station" and it was called GMA Bicol in its branding, which primarily covers the provinces of Camarines Sur (via Channel 7) and Albay (via Channel 12).
September 17, 2012 – November 7, 2014 - GMA Bicol launched its flagship local newscast Baretang Bikol.
November 10, 2014 - GMA Bicol re-launched its flagship local newscast 24 Oras Bikol.
 April 24, 2015 - GMA Network decided to cancel airing 24 Oras Bikol as part of the strategic streamlining undertaken by the network. The station is now downgraded as a relay (satellite-selling) station.
February 1, 2021 - GMA Bicol has been re-upgraded into an originating station with the relaunch of their regional newscast Balitang Bicolandia covering Camarines Sur, Albay, Catanduanes, Sorsogon, Masbate and Camarines Norte.
November 9, 2021 - GMA Bicol started its digital test broadcast on UHF Channel 38 covering Metro Naga and the whole of Camarines Sur.

GMA TV-7 Naga Programs

 Balitang Bicolandia
 Mornings with GMA Regional TV (simulcast from GMA Dagupan)
 Word of God Network 
 Peñafrancia Festival (Yearly)

Previously Aired Local Programs 
Flash Bulletin (2010)
Let's Fiesta
Bicolandia Isyu Ngonian (November 22, 2010-September 14, 2012) [Weekdays 5:00 PM] - GMA Bicol's public affairs program. 
24 Oras Bikol - defunct regional newscast, cancelled due to streamlining of regional operations
Visita Iglesia

Digital television

Digital channels

DWAI-TV's digital signal operates on UHF channel 38 (617.143 MHz) and broadcasts on the following subchannels:

Area of Coverage 
 Naga City 
 Camarines Sur
 Portion of Camarines Norte
 Portion of Quezon Province

Personalities

Present 
Jessie Cruzat as Anchor and News Producer of Balitang Bicolandia and National Anchor of GMA Regional TV News.
Kate Delovieres as Co-Anchor of Balitang Bicolandia.
Chariza Pagtalunan-Olivares
Jessica Calinog
Rose Nieva
Mary Dawn Jimenez

Past 
Rhayne Palino
Katherine Henry
Charm Ragiles
Veblen Reynes
Elmer Caseles (Moved to 89.5 Radyo Natin Naga)
Avril Daja
Mark Bongat
Kaye Botastas
Maila Aycocho
Michelle Chua
Michael Jaucian
Michael Biando (Moved to 103.1 Brigada News FM Naga)

Rebroadcasters

GMA Naga on Cable

See also
DWQW (Barangay FM 101.5 Naga)
List of GMA Network stations

References

Television stations in Naga, Camarines Sur
GMA Network stations
Television channels and stations established in 1983
Digital television stations in the Philippines